Sahani may refer to:
Alaka Sahani (born 1974), Indian film editor
Anil Kumar Sahani (born 1963), Indian politician
Arjun Sahani, Indian politician
Harvindar Kumar Sahani (born 1965), Indian politician
Kidar Nath Sahani (1926–2012), Indian politician
Parth Sahani (born 1993), Indian cricketer
Mdé-Sahani, Comoros